Ken Baker (born 9 September 1944) is a former  Australian rules footballer who played with St Kilda in the Victorian Football League (VFL).

Notes

External links 

Living people
1944 births
Australian rules footballers from Victoria (Australia)
St Kilda Football Club players
Rutherglen Football Club players